The 1983 Niger State gubernatorial election occurred on August 13, 1983. NPN candidate Awwal Ibrahim won the election.

Results
Awwal Ibrahim representing NPN won the election. The election held on August 13, 1983.

References 

Niger State gubernatorial elections
Niger State gubernatorial election
Niger State gubernatorial election